Mohammadabad (also Romanized as Moḩammadābād; also known as Mahmūdābād) is a village in Zirkuh Rural District, Central District, Zirkuh County, South Khorasan Province, Iran. At the 2006 census, its population was 852, in 198 families.

References 

Populated places in Zirkuh County